Life with My Father is a Canadian drama film, directed by Sébastien Rose and released in 2005. The film stars Raymond Bouchard as François Agira, a successful novelist returning home to Quebec after spending several years living in France to announce that he is terminally ill, forcing his estranged sons Paul (Paul Ahmarani) and Patrick (David La Haye) to make peace with him and each other.

The cast also includes Hélène Florent, Julie du Page, Pierre-Antoine Lasnier, Nicolas Canuel, Benoît McGinnis and Christine Beaulieu.

The film premiered theatrically in March 2005.

The film won the Audience Award at the Karlovy Vary International Film Festival.

References

External links

2005 films
Canadian drama films
Films shot in Quebec
Films directed by Sébastien Rose
French-language Canadian films
2000s Canadian films